Superfly was a series of professional boxing cards centered around the super flyweight division.

History
The concept was created by promoter Tom Loeffler and has been broadcast on HBO Boxing After Dark. The events were originally meant to showcase Román González, regarded as the best active boxer, pound for pound, at the time. But the two events to date have been headlined by Srisaket Sor Rungvisai, following his knockout win over the former at the first installment of the series.

Historically, American audiences have rarely been interested in fighters at lower weight classes. However, the Superfly events are built to showcase several of the best fighters at super flyweight and adjacent divisions.

Events

Superfly
The first event was held on September 9, 2017 at the StubHub Center in Carson, California.

Superfly 2
The second event was held on 24 February 2018 at The Forum in Inglewood, California.

Superfly 3

The third event was held on 8 September 2018 at The Forum in Inglewood, California.

References

American sports television series
Boxing competitions
2017 in boxing
2018 in boxing
2017 in sports in California
2018 in sports in California
Superfly
Boxing competitions in the United States
Boxing in California
Boxing on HBO
Boxing matches